"Club Michelle" is a song by American rock singer Eddie Money, from his 1983 album Where's the Party?. It was released as a single and reached #66 on the Billboard Hot 100 in 1984 (see 1984 in music).

1984 singles
1983 songs
Eddie Money songs
Songs written by Mitchell Froom
Columbia Records singles
Songs written by Eddie Money